B. horti may refer to:

Bacillus horti, a Gram-positive bacterium
Brachybacterium horti, a Gram-positive bacterium